is a Japanese singer, who is best known for her work throughout the 1990s, most particularly for her singles which were performed for and featured in anime, most notably the Neon Genesis Evangelion franchise.

Career 
Takahashi began her career in 1991, and released her first album, Pizzicato, in 1992, which reached #28 on the Oricon weekly charts. In the following years, she released the albums Kugatsu no Sotsugyō which charted, and Watashi wo Mitsukete, which did not achieve the same success of her previous albums. 

In 1995, she released the single , which was used as the opening song in the anime series Neon Genesis Evangelion. The song has received gold and platinum certifications, charted on the Oricon weekly chart numerous times, and has frequently been cited as one of the most influential songs used in anime. She has remixed and released several versions of the single, which have been met with the same commercial success.  

In 1996, she released the album Living with Joy. Following her achievements with music, she continued to release singles and albums throughout the 2000s and 2010s, for which she was met with mixed success. 

Discography

Albums

Studio albums

Compilation albums

Singles

Maxi Singles

Split Singles

As YAWMIN 

Footnotes
 — = N/A

Other songs

Solo works

As YAUMIN

As featured artist

References

External links 
  Yoko Takahashi Official Web
  Yoko Takahashi on Anison Database

1966 births
Anime singers
Living people
Singers from Tokyo
20th-century Japanese women singers
20th-century Japanese singers
21st-century Japanese women singers
21st-century Japanese singers